The Liga Superior de Baloncesto de El Salvador (abbreviated Liga Superior de BKB, and literally in English "National Basketball League") is the top level of the El Salvador basketball league system. The league is controlled by the El Salvador Basketball Federation (in Spanish: Federación Salvadoreña de Baloncesto.).

It is designed like the NBA, with regular season,  and playoffs.

The league came to an end in 2016, a new league was formed and rebranded as Liga Mayor de Baloncesto or LMB for short.

Current teams (2013–14 season)

Liga Superior de BKB
 San Marcos
 Soles de San Salvador  (replaced UTEC)
 Denver
 Leones 
 Rolls-Royce
 Santa Ana B.C.
 Chaleco 
 AND1 San Miguel

List of Champions

External links
Salvadorean league on Latinbasket.com 
 http://www.laprensagrafica.com/TagSearch/12573
 http://gurupixhost.com/ligasuperior/
 http://www.sportingpulse.com/comp_info.cgi?c=0-9279-0-303915-0&pool=1001&round=0&a=FIXTURE

Basketball in El Salvador
Sports leagues in El Salvador
El
Sports leagues established in 1985
1985 establishments in El Salvador